House of Lies is an American comedy-drama television series created by Matthew Carnahan. The show, which premiered on Showtime on January 8, 2012, is based on the book House of Lies: How Management Consultants Steal Your Watch and Then Tell You the Time, written by Martin Kihn, a former consultant at Booz Allen Hamilton. It follows a group of management consultants who stop at nothing to get business deals done. On May 17, 2016, Showtime cancelled the series after five seasons, with the series finale airing June 12, 2016.

Premise
The show focuses on both the personal and business lives of Marty Kaan, a manipulative, immoral, driven and cold management consultant.

Originally, Marty was a highly successful partner at consultancy firm Galweather Stearn, where he headed up a pod consisting of engagement manager Jeannie van der Hooven, and associates Clyde Oberholt and Doug Guggenheim. He later leaves this position to head up his own firm, Kaan & Associates.

In addition to the questionable business practices of Marty and his team, the series also focuses on Marty's personal life. He deals with his disagreeable management consultant ex-wife Monica, his retired-psychiatrist father Jeremiah and his confidently flamboyant son Roscoe. The main character, Marty, often breaks the fourth wall; he talks to the viewers in a freeze-frame bit in which he alone moves and the others in the background 'freeze' but continue where they left off. Alternatively, he talks to the audience while everyone moves but the others seem oblivious to the fact that he is on a monologue.

Cast and characters

Main cast
 Don Cheadle as Marty Kaan, the immoral and deceitful proprietor of consultancy firm Kaan & Associates. Before he started his own firm, he led a pod for Galweather-Stearn. Marty is willing to do anything to close the deal and, as such, alienates the vast majority of people he comes into contact with, a fact that he cares very little about. Due to questionable business practices, Marty spends several months in prison before the start of season 4, and this adds even more strain to his already-tense relationship with Roscoe and Jeremiah.
 Cheadle also served as executive producer through his Crescendo Productions banner.
 Kristen Bell as Jeannie van der Hooven, a partner at Kaan & Associates with whom Marty has a complex relationship. She was part of Marty's pod before he left Galweather. She later led her own pod in Galweather before ditching them for Kaan & Associates, where she becomes a partner. Jeannie was inadvertently responsible for the FBI bust on Kaan & Associates. Consequently, Marty blames her for his stint in jail. In season 4, Jeannie is pregnant with Marty's child, but he is reluctant to be involved as he has not forgiven her.
 Ben Schwartz as Clyde Oberholt, a member of Marty's consultant pod who specialises in marketing and spin. He was part of Marty's pod before he left Galweather. He briefly became part of Monica's pod in Kinsley & Associates when he and Marty had a falling-out. He eventually worked his way into Kaan & Associates. He has a jealous, arrogant and often cruel personality, and very rarely shows any real emotions. Clyde struggles with drug addiction throughout the later seasons.
 Josh Lawson as Doug Guggenheim, a member of Marty's consultant pod who specialises in numerical analysis. He was part of Marty's pod before he left Galweather. After Marty left, he briefly became a part of Jeannie's pod before they both left for Kaan & Associates. It is also known that he graduated from Harvard, he is seen constantly reminding this fact to everyone. He marries Sarah (Jenny Slate) (Season 2) but after he sends her a drunken text message, she cleans out his bank accounts and leaves (Season 4). 
 Dawn Olivieri as Monica Talbot (starring seasons 1–3, recurring seasons 4 & 5), an ex-partner at rival firm Kinsley & Associates, and Marty's ex-wife. She and Marty often taunt and abuse each other when they meet, and often engage in angry sex.
 Donis Leonard Jr. as Roscoe Kaan, the flamboyant 15-year-old son of Monica and Marty. He wears eyeliner and experimental clothing and often has an attitude problem towards his father. In season 4, it is shown that Roscoe has fallen in with the school burn-outs and has begun smoking marijuana.
 Glynn Turman as Jeremiah Kaan, Marty's ex-psychiatrist father and Roscoe's main caregiver. Jeremiah detests Monica, and is frequently forced to act as a mediator between her and Marty for Roscoe's sake. He is dating Chantelle, a much younger psychology student. The relationship has been happily accepted by the rest of the family.

Recurring cast

Season 1
 John Aylward as K. Warren McDale, CEO/president of Metro-Capital.
 Griffin Dunne as Marco "The Rainmaker" Pelios, president, CEO, and senior partner at Galweather-Stearn.
 Megalyn Echikunwoke as April, Marty's law student girlfriend.
 Mo Gaffney as Principal Gita, principal of the school Roscoe attends.
 Greg Germann as Greg Norbert, CFO of Metro-Capital.
 Anna Camp as Rachel Norbert, wife, and then ex-wife of Greg Norbert.
 Richard Schiff as Harrison "Skip" Galweather, senior partner and co-founder of Galweather-Stearn.

Season 2
 Bess Armstrong as Julianne Hofschrager, interim CEO of Galweather-Stearn.
 Adam Brody as Nate, CEO/president of an adult sex toy company.
 Kevin Dobson as Mr. Pincus, owner of the Emerald casino in Las Vegas.
 Lisa Edelstein as Brynn, assistant/political advisor for Carl Criswell.
 Taylor Gerard Hart as Alex Dushkin, co-owner of Las Vegas Nightclub War.
 Evan Hart as Kyle Dushkin, co-owner of Las Vegas Nightclub War.
 Ronete Levenson as Tessa, Monica's vegan chef ex-girlfriend.
 Nia Long as Tamara, Galweather & Stearn's newest employee and Marty's classmate from business school.
 Eden Malyn as 'Zanna, the pod's personal assistant.
 Michael McDonald as Carl Criswell, CEO/president of US National Bank.
 Elimu Nelson as Kevin, Tamara's husband.
 Jenny Slate as Sarah Guggenheim, Doug's girlfriend and, later, wife.
 Larenz Tate as Malcolm Kaan, Marty's brother.
 Mather Zickel as Michael Carlson, owner of the Vibrato casino in Las Vegas.

Season 3
 Genevieve Angelson as Caitlyn Hobart, part of Marty's new pod.
 Eugene Cordero as Everett, part of Monica's pod.
 Brigid Coulter as the wife of Andrew  "'Dre" Collins.
 Eliza Coupe as Marisa McClintock, the youngest of the McClintock family. She was founder of MediaWolfOnline newspaper and later became the chairwoman of entire McClintock Media Group after some help from Clyde.
 Ryan Gaul as Will, part of Marty's new pod.
 Rob Gleeson as Jeffrey, part of Marty's new pod.
 Lauren Lapkus as Benita Spire, part of Jeanie's new pod. She leaked info to the press that led to the demise of Galweather under The Rainmaker.
 Alice Hunter as Chantelle, a young PhD candidate who is dating Jeremiah.
 John Carroll Lynch as Gil Selby, one of Galweather-Stearn's senior partners.
 Mekhi Phifer as Andrew "Dre" Collins, cofounder of DollaHyde, a hip-hop fashion label. He was a former drug dealer.
 T.I. as Lukas Frye, cofounder of DollaHyde, a hip-hop fashion label. He was also a former drug dealer.
 Brad Schmidt as JC, part of Jeanie's new pod.
 Daniel Stern as Robert Tretorn, CEO, president, and founder of Free Range Foods.
 Bex Taylor-Klaus as Lex, Roscoe's partner who turns out to be a bad influence on him.
 Milana Vayntrub as Christy, part of Monica's pod. She was arrested and fired for stabbing Monica in "Power"
 Rhea Seehorn as Samantha, Jeannie's friend at the Department of Justice

Season 4
 Mary McCormack as Denna Altshuler, a tough, highly successful white knight investor and owner of Global Investments, who is also Marty's "fuck-buddy"
 Demetri Martin as Ellis Gage Hightower, a shark-in-the-waters businessman and godhead of electrics cars whom Marty befriends in prison, who also owns Gage Motors 
 Valorie Curry as Kelsey, a confident computer programmer who both Clyde and Doug chase romantically 
 Alicia Witt as Maya Lindholm, a brilliant engineer and former partner of Ellis Gage
 Fred Melamed as Harvey Oberholt, the father of Clyde, who has a difficult relationship with his son and is dying of cancer

Season 5
 Brianna Baker as Tess Symington, Green Point owner, Dungeons & Dragons player and briefly Doug's girlfriend
 Steven Weber as Ron Zobel
 Wanda Sykes as Rita, Jeremiah's partner
 Glenn Howerton as Seth Buckley, a mayoral candidate, who has gotten romantically involved with Jeannie
 Donald Faison as Donald, friend and golfing partner of Marty
 Michael Cudlitz and Stacey Hinnen as Kohl brothers, businessmen who have business plans in Cuba and want to acquire K&A

Episodes

Production
The series is executive produced by Matthew Carnahan, Jessika Borsiczky, and Stephen Hopkins, with the pilot written by Carnahan and directed by Hopkins.

Development
On December 13, 2010, House of Lies was given a pilot order.  On  April 7, 2011, the series was given a 12 episode pick-up by Showtime.  The series is based on Martin Kihn's book, House of Lies: How Management Consultants Steal Your Watch and Then Tell You the Time. David Nevins, president of entertainment at Showtime, announced during the 2011 Television Critics Association press tour that the show was set to premiere on January 8, 2012.

Casting
Casting announcements began in December 2010, with Don Cheadle as the first actor to be cast, as Marty Kaan, "a highly successful, cut-throat consultant who is never above using any means (or anyone) necessary to get his clients the information they want". The next actor to be cast was Dawn Olivieri who plays Monica, "Marty's crazy, pill-popping ex-wife and biggest professional competition as her consulting firm is No. 1 compared to Marty's No. 2."  Ben Schwartz and Josh Lawson were cast next, Schwartz playing Clyde Oberholt, a member of Marty's team and his closest friend, and Lawson as Doug Guggenheim, Marty's Harvard-educated associate.  Last cast were Kristen Bell, who plays Jeannie van der Hooven, "a razor-sharp, Ivy-League graduate who works at Marty’s firm", Donis Leonard Jr. as Roscoe Kaan, Marty's son, and Glynn Turman as Jeremiah Kaan, Marty's psychoanalyst father. Later, Richard Schiff was cast as Marty's boss.

House of Lies Live
On December 29, 2013, Showtime presented "House of Lies Live" which featured members of the main cast and guest actors on the show performing at the UCB theatre in the first broadcast of long form improv.

Reception

Throughout its run, House of Lies has received mixed reviews from critics.

Entertainment Weeklys Ken Tucker, reviewing the pilot episode, thought the show's premise "sounds terrific in concept", that "Cheadle and Bell are each in their own way exceedingly charming performers with a devilish aspect to their images", and that it has debuted at a good time: "at this time in history, who doesn't want to see undeservingly wealthy people get fleeced, or at least brought low by their avarice?" But ultimately Tucker found House of Lies wanting, writing that it is actually not "all that interesting", and that its "crucial weakness is its dead language". For Tucker, "there's no novelty or freshness in House of Lies' patter or its penis-placement" (the latter comment being a reference to House of Lies' "butt-load of the sort of sexual activity one can get away with on pay-cable"). He later included it on his Top 5 Worst TV Shows of 2012, taking the fourth spot.

In stark contrast, Matt Rouch, writing for TV Guide, thought that "as a pitiless, biting satire of the debauched state of American big business, it's no lie to call this one of the smartest, funniest shows of the new year", praising its being "[d]eeply cynical, garish in its raunchiness and always rudely, lewdly hilarious". It "swims in a shark tank of such appalling survival-of-the-nastiest bad behavior it could launch its own channel: Human Animal Planet". Where Tucker finds House of Lies lines and dialogue poor, Rouch praises Don Cheadle's character's lines: Cheadle's character "often steps out of a freeze-frame to deliver scathing stylized asides to the audience, talking straight to the camera to teach us his lingo and soulless trade secrets". (By contrast, Tucker found these freeze-frame asides a "visual gimmick" and complained of derivative lines: "Creator Matthew Carnahan [...] loads his new show with lines that sound borrowed from Glengarry Glen Ross ("Closing is what I do!")."

Sarah Huges of The Independent called House of Lies "A Comedy for the One Per Cent," saying it's a "half-hour comedy about wealthy slicksters screening right in the middle of one of the biggest economic depressions America has experienced." Although calling the cast and production outstanding and funny in an artistic and technical way, the UK reception - by the standards of the Independent - seemed less positive than the rest. "House of Lies is asking us not simply to laugh at this bunch of chancers, but to admire them for the way in which they rip people off," she writes, calling for a check-up on corporate America.

Awards and nominations

References

External links

 Official website
 Galweather & Stearn website
 

2010s American LGBT-related comedy television series
2012 American television series debuts
2016 American television series endings
Fiction about interracial romance
Showtime (TV network) original programming
English-language television shows
Television shows set in Los Angeles